The following lists events that happened during 1974 in Australia.

Incumbents

Monarch – Elizabeth II
Governor-General – Sir Paul Hasluck (until 11 July), then Sir John Kerr
Prime Minister – Gough Whitlam
Deputy Prime Minister – Lance Barnard (until 12 June), then Jim Cairns
Opposition Leader –  Billy Snedden
Chief Justice – Sir Garfield Barwick

State and Territory Leaders
Premier of New South Wales – Sir Robert Askin
Opposition Leader – Neville Wran
Premier of Queensland – Joh Bjelke-Petersen
Opposition Leader – Jack Houston (until 1 July), then Perc Tucker (until 7 December), then Tom Burns
Premier of South Australia – Don Dunstan
Opposition Leader – Bruce Eastick
Premier of Tasmania – Eric Reece
Opposition Leader – Max Bingham
Premier of Victoria – Rupert Hamer
Opposition Leader – Clyde Holding
Premier of Western Australia – John Tonkin (until 8 April), then Sir Charles Court
Opposition Leader – Sir Charles Court (until 8 April), then John Tonkin
Majority Leader of the Northern Territory – Goff Letts (from 19 October)

Governors and Administrators
Governor of New South Wales – Sir Roden Cutler
Governor of Queensland – Sir Colin Hannah
Governor of South Australia – Sir Mark Oliphant 
Governor of Tasmania – Sir Stanley Burbury
Governor of Victoria – Major General Sir Rohan Delacombe (until 24 May), then Sir Henry Winneke (from 1 June)
Governor of Western Australia – Major General Sir Douglas Kendrew (until 6 January), then (Sir) Hughie Edwards
Administrator of Norfolk Island – Edward Pickerd
Administrator of the Northern Territory – Jock Nelson
High Commissioner of Papua New Guinea – Les Johnson (until March 1974), then Tom Critchley

Events

January
 January 1974 is also the wettest month since before 1900 over the following sub-regions of Australia:
 the Northern Territory with 
 the Murray-Darling Basin with 
 1 January – 
Queen Elizabeth II creates five new knights in New South Wales and two in Queensland in her New Year Honours List. Chief Justice of New South Wales, Mr Justice Kerr, is made a Knight Commander of the Order of St Michael and St George.  Broadcaster John Laws is appointed an OBE.
Evonne Goolagong defeats Chris Evert to win the Australian women's singles title at Kooyong Stadium.
Enoch Powell, Conservative MP and fiery critic of Britain's immigration laws, arrives in Australia.
2 January – 
Steelworkers at the BHP are awarded big pay rises which will add $28 million to its annual wage bill immediately and $38 million by next December.
Mary, the 16-year-old gorilla which had her right leg amputated at Taronga Zoo on 11 December 1973 dies.
Federal Education Minister Kim Beazley resumes work after a two-month convalescence after he collapsed in Parliament House on 6 November 1973.
An Ansett Airlines Fokker F27 Friendship makes an emergency landing at Tullamarine Airport after a wheel fell from the undercarriage as the aircraft lifted off the runway.
3 January – 
French President Pompidou reaffirms that France would continue to hold nuclear tests in the South Pacific.  This draws an angry response from Australian unionists and the New Zealand Government.
In Victoria Street, East Sydney, a 30-man team of workmen use sledgehammers and axes to batter down the doors of 19 houses occupied by squatters barricaded themselves in, protesting against the proposed development.
5 January – 
Deputy Prime Minister Lance Barnard makes a speech in New York to the American-Australian Association in which he declares that Australia would not be a "junior partner" in strategic and military alliances.  He says that Americans must expect that Australia's relations with America will be "consistent with our status as an independent nation".
Four people, including three flood victims trying to get home to Darwin, die when a light plane crashes near Barkly Down homestead, 60 miles north-west of Mount Isa, Queensland.
Prime Minister Gough Whitlam presents the inaugural E.G. Whitlam Shield to the Australian racing team for its victory over a visiting US team at Liverpool Speedway.
24 January - Cyclone Wanda makes landfall near Double Island Point. Large parts of South East Queensland, particularly Brisbane, and northern New South Wales are flooded.
31 January – 
Private banks ask for immediate arbitration in the bank officers' salaries dispute which had spread to all States except Queensland.  The bank officers are refusing to handle commercial cheques until they are successful in their claim for a 25 per cent pay rise.
Air Vice-Marshal R.T.Susans makes a public plea to Prime Minister Gough Whitlam to maintain Australia's two squadrons of Royal Australian Air Force Mirages in Malaysia.

February
3 February – A riot of 250 inmates erupts at Bathurst Gaol – at least nine prisoners are shot and a large part of the jail is destroyed by fire.
4 February – 
The Federal Minister for Labour, Mr Cameron, meets officials of the Australian Bank Officials Association in Melbourne in an effort to break the deadlock in the bank dispute. The association decides to lift is week-old ban on handling commercial cheques.
Federal Treasurer, Frank Crean, estimates that flood damage in Queensland will probably exceed $50 million.
Prime Minister Gough Whitlam holds talks in Vientiane with Laotian Prime Minister Prince Souvanna Phouma and says that all foreign forces should be withdrawn from the Indo-China region by the Great Powers.  He also says the United States should stop flying military hardware into Saigon.
6 February – 
High tides and heavy seas cause flooding and damage to homes and other buildings on the Queensland Gold and Sunshine Coasts and the New South Wales North Coast. Waves of up to 20 feet batter the coast as Cyclone Pam sweeps southward offshore.
Acting Immigration Minister, Senator Dr. McClelland announces he will exercise his powers under the Passport Act to cancel the passports of Alexander Barton and his son who are currently residing in Rio de Janeiro.
7 February – 
The New South Wales Government issues warrants for the arrest of millionaire businessman Alexander Barton and his son Thomas, who are in Brazil. The Federal Government can now move to have the Bartons extradited from Rio de Janeiro. The Bartons left Australia with their wives soon after the collapse of their companies and the loss then sanicof more than $250 million of the public's money.
In Singapore, Prime Minister Gough Whitlam and Singapore Prime Minister Lee Kuan Yew bury their public feud and compliment each other on their policies. Lee praises the changes in Australia's immigration policy, assistance to Aborigines and aid to refugees from Bangladesh and Pakistan.
26 February – Mungo Man, a human skeleton estimated to be 40,000 years old, uncovered at Lake Mungo

March
25 March - The Liberal Party led by Charles Court wins the 1974 Western Australian state election.

April
12 April - Tasmanian Attorney-General and Deputy Premier Merv Everett resigns to contest the Senate.  He is replaced by W.A. Neilson.

May
18 May – 
The 1974 Australian federal election is held. Labor retains with 66 of the 127 seats, compared with 67 of 125 in the old House. In the Senate, the Democratic Labour Party is eliminated, having failed to come to its usual arrangement with the Coalition parties. With 29 seats each to Labor and the Coalition, the balance is ostensibly held by the Independent from Tasmania, Townley, and Liberal Movement's Steele Hall, from South Australia.
The 1974 Australian referendum is held simultaneously with the federal election. Referendum proposals on democratic elections (including one person one vote), simultaneous Senate and House elections, methods of altering the Constitution and local government received final overall votes of 46.8% Yes: 48.3% No.
John Howard enters Parliament as an Opposition backbencher for the Division of Bennelong.

July
1 July – Australia's road signs switch from imperial to metric.

October
 October – The first Australian credit card, Bankcard, is introduced.

December
7 December - The 1974 Queensland state election is held. Premier Joh Bjelke-Petersen had campaigned on "the alien, stagnating, centralist, socialist, communist-inspired policies of the federal Labor government".  In the resulting 10.7% swing against Labor, the Nationals secured 39 seats, the Liberals 30 and Labor slumped to 11.
24 December – Cyclone Tracy devastates the city of Darwin. The official death toll was 71

Arts and literature

 Conductor Bernard Heinze is announced as Australian of the Year
 Ronald McKie's novel The Mango Tree wins the Miles Franklin Award

Film
 The Cars That Ate Paris, directed by Peter Weir, is released

Television
 The long running popular music program Countdown first screens
 Soap operas The Box and Class of '74 begin

Sport
14 September – John Farrington wins his third men's national marathon title, clocking 2:17:23 in Gawler.
21 September – Minor premiers Eastern Suburbs defeat Canterbury-Bankstown 19–4 at the 1974 NSWRFL Grand Final, claiming their first premiership since 1945 and their tenth overall. Balmain finish in last position on points difference, claiming their first wooden spoon since 1911.
 Think Big wins the Melbourne Cup
 Victoria wins the Sheffield Shield
 Apollo takes line honours in the Sydney to Hobart Yacht Race. Love and War is the handicap winner
 Australia defeats the USA 2–1 in the Federation Cup
 The Australian team makes its first World Cup appearance when it competes in the 1974 FIFA World Cup
 Rothmans medal awarded to Graham Eadie
 Richmond wins the 78th VFL Premiership (Richmond 18.20 (128) d North Melbourne 13.9 (87))
 Brownlow Medal awarded to Keith Greig (North Melbourne)

Births
 17 January – Rob Stokes, politician and lawyer
 24 January – Melissa Tkautz, actress
 28 February – Kate Allen, field hockey player
 22 March – Irena Olevsky, synchronized swimmer
 5 April – Deborah Sosimenko, hammer thrower
 1 May – Kellie Crawford (née Hoggart), singer and actress, Teen Queens and Hi-5
 3 May – Peter Everitt, footballer and radio host  
 19 May – Andrew Johns, rugby league footballer
 6 June – Nik Kosef, rugby league footballer
 12 June – Scott Ferrier, decathlete
 13 June – Tristram Woodhouse, field hockey forward
 22 June – Lyndsay Walker, cricketer  
 2 July 
 Michael Budd, actor and director 
 Matthew Reilly, writer
 6 July – James Swan, boxer
 15 July – Chris Taylor, comedian
 16 July
Michelle Chandler, basketball player
Wendell Sailor, rugby league footballer
 12 August – Karl Stefanovic, TV host  
 4 September – Andrew Hansen, comedian and musician
 28 September – Shane Webcke, rugby league footballer
 18 October – Brett Dallas, rugby league player  
 20 October – Catherine Sutherland, actress, Power Rangers
 1 November – Emma George, pole vaulter
 19 December – Ricky Ponting, cricketer

Deaths
 6 April – Hudson Fysh, aviator and businessman (b. 1895)
 1 May – Sir Frank Packer, media proprietor (b. 1906)
 10 June – Prince Henry, Duke of Gloucester, 11th Governor General of Australia (born and died in the United Kingdom) (b. 1900)
 31 August – Jim Zimin, Russian Empire-born Australian peanut farmer (b. 1902)
 10 October – George Bennett, Australian rules footballer (Footscray, Hawthorn) (b. 1911)

See also
 1974 in Australian television
 List of Australian films of 1974

References

 
Australia
Years of the 20th century in Australia